Tomislavgrad, also known by its former name Duvno, is a town and municipality located in Canton 10 of the Federation of Bosnia and Herzegovina, an entity of Bosnia and Herzegovina. It mainly covers an area of the historical and geographical region of Tropolje. As of 2013, it has a population of 33,032 inhabitants.

In the Roman times it was known as Delminium. During the middle ages when it was part of Croatia and Bosnia, the town was known as Županjac, a name that remained until 1928, when it was changed to Tomislavgrad. In 1946, the town's name was again changed to Duvno, and in 1990, the name was returned to Tomislavgrad.

Name
The town name means literally "Tomislav town". The name was changed from Županjac to Tomislavgrad in 1928 by King Alexander I of Yugoslavia in tribute to his son Prince Tomislav and also Tomislav of Croatia, the first king of the Kingdom of Croatia, who was crowned in the area. The name was changed to Duvno after World War II by Yugoslav communist authorities. In 1990 the name was restored to Tomislavgrad. Also, the town is sometimes referred to simply as "Tomislav". The Catholic diocese in that area is still called Mostar-Duvno. During the Roman Empire the town was called Delminium and during the medieval period in Kingdom of Croatia and Kingdom of Bosnia it was called Županjac. Under the Ottoman Empire, it was called Županj-potok; and under Austria-Hungary, Županjac again.

Location 

Demographics

Population

Ethnic composition

History

Ancient times

Illyrian time

The area has been inhabited by Illyrian tribe of Dalmatae and Delminium was a town established by them in nowadays Tomislavgrad. Delminium was situated on the location of today's Roman Catholic basilica, named after the first Croatian saint, Nikola Tavelić.

The area of Tomislavgrad has been populated from 4000 BC – 2400 BC, even before the Illyrians arrived, and from that time only polished stone axes remained as proof that someone was there. Bronze Age (1800 BC – 800 BC) also left few marks in Tomislavgrad. The archeological collection of the friary in Široki Brijeg had a few items found in an area of Tomislavgrad from the Bronze Age: 34 bronze sickles, 3 axes, and two spears. Those items were found in Stipanjići and Lug near Tomislavgrad. Those items were given to the Archeological collection "fra Mijo Čuić and fra Stjepan Naletilić". Later, Fr Vojislav Mikulić found a bronze ax in Letka which he gave to those collections. Unfortunately, the collection was destroyed in a fire at the end of World War II. Only one sickle and ax survived the tragedy. However, this collection says that the population of Tomislavgrad at the time worked in the primary sector, they were cattlemen, farmers, and warriors.

Unlike their unnamed predecessors, Illyrians left material proofs from their time. On the slopes of the mountains which circle Tomislavgrad, Illyrians built 36 fortifications. These forts served as watchtowers or forts against the enemy. There are also many graves of Illyrians which means that they cared about their dead. Same as forts, graves are dating from the Bronze and Iron Ages to the Roman conquest of Delminium (Tomislavgrad). In the graves of dead Illyrians, jewelry and items which the dead used were found.

Other inhabitants, except Illyrians, were Celts. They brought higher culture, crafts, and most importantly better arms. But soon, Celts have been assimilated as Illyrians, since there was only a small number of them.

As Romans conquered the territory of the Illyrian tribe Ardiaei, and so, Delmataes and their tribal union was the last bastion of Illyrian freedom. The Dalmatae attacked Roman wards near Neretva, Greek merchant towns, and the Roman-friendly Illyrian tribe Daors. The Illyrians upgraded their settlements into strong forts and surrounded their capital with wreaths of smaller forts. It is assumed that, during that time, 5,000 Dalmatae lived in Delminium.

In 167 BC Illyrian forts could not stop Roman legions and Rome conquered the entire Adriatic coast south of Neretva; the state of the Ardieaei was also destroyed.  The first conflict between the Dalmatae and Rome started in 156 BC. The consuls Gaius Marcius Figulus, then Publius Cornelius Scipio Nasica Corculum conquered and destroyed Delminium; the latter received a triumph in Rome for this victory. Reports of writers during that time say that Delminium was a "large city", almost inaccessible and impregnable. Romans shot lighted arrows at wooden houses, which then burned the city. After various rebellions led by Dalmatae and three wars with Rome, their land was lastly conquered for good in 9 AD.

Roman time
After the Roman conquest of Delminium, they started building roads and bridges. Roads that led to the mainland of Balkans from the Adriatic coast in Salona (Solin) and Narona (Vid near Metković) crossed in Delminium (Tomislavgrad). Remains of those and other Roman roads are still in existence. Romans introduced their culture, language, legislation, and religion. For the next 400 years, Tomislavgrad was in peace.

After the Romans defeated Dalmatae, Tomislavgrad was almost abandoned. There was also, for some period, a military crew of Romans stationed there to keep Illyrians under control. Romans started to rebuild Delminium in 18 and 19 AD in the time of emperor Tiberius. During that time the center of the city was built, a Roman forum. This forum was built on possession of present-day Nikola Tavelić basilica.

In 1896 Fra Anđeo Nuć discovered various sculptures of Roman pagan deities, fragments of pagan sarcophagi, and fragments of columns of the medieval Christian churches. Of all those discoveries, the most prominent are two votive monuments and altars dedicated to goddess Diana, one altar dedicated to native Illyrian god Armatus and one votive plate dedicated to goddess Libera. Later, relief of goddess Diana was also found and one relief of Diana and Silvanus together. Also, new pagan altars, fragments of sarcophagi, clay pottery, parts of columns, and various other findings from the Roman and early medieval ages were found. This led to the conclusion that on the place of the present-day Catholic graveyard "Karaula" (which was previously an Ottoman military border post and guardhouse) was a Roman and Illyrian pagan sanctuary and graveyard.

Middle Ages 

For the period of the early Middle Ages, due to rare and scanty documents, the territory of present-day Tomsilavgrad remains in great darkness, as is the case with the history of the Croats. Written traces are non-existent. Some of the Croatian traditions were recorded by later chroniclers, for example in the Chronicle of the Priest of Duklja, compiled by Archbishop Gregory of Bar in the second half of the 11th century, and the work De administrando imperio by the Byzantine Emperor Constantine VII. Constantine VII states that the Croats arrived in the last wave of migration from the area of Greater or White Croatia (around present-day Krakow in Poland) to the area of the Roman provinces of Pannonia and Dalmatia.

The process of immigration of Croats to the area of today's Tomislavgrad and their interaction with the indigenous population are not fully elucidated. The Croats broke through the defensive lines on the Danube and began to gradually settle in the aforementioned Roman provinces at the end of the 6th, and especially at the beginning of the 7th century. Constantine VII records that they came at the invitation of Emperor Heraclius to defend the empire from the Avars, in which they were successful. In the conquered area they established their own kingdom. Pope John IV, himself a Dalmatian from the city of Salona, ​​in 640 sent a mission with Abbot Martin to redeem the captured natives from the Croats. Archbishop Grgur notes that at the end of the 8th century, the area of today's Tomislavgrad was in the center of the then Croatian state. Namely, he writes in his chronicle that in the time of King Budimir, a magnificent national assembly was held in Duvno in which the papal envoys took part. The Croatian king was crowned at the assembly, who at the same time divided the kingdom into administrative provinces. Duvno was on the border between the province of Red Croatia in the east and White Croatia in the west. Dominik Mandić maintains that the assembly was held around 753, however, the Archbishop of Bar dates the reign of King Budimir from 887 to 917, which would mean that the assembly was held in 885 or 886. Ivan Kukuljević Sakcinski argued that Budimir was in fact Tomislav of Croatia. Other historians dispute that the assembly was held at all, calling into question the credibility of the Chronicle.

The end of the 8th century for Croatia and the area of Duvno was marked by significant changes. Charlemagne defeated the Avars in 796 and established the rule of the Frankish Empire in Croatian territories, so his empire now bordered Byzantium. Charles recognized the supreme authority of Byzantium over Venice and the Dalmatian city-states. This had significant consequences for areas outside Dalmatian cities inhabited by Croats. The Frankish political system was also being introduced in these areas and Frankish Christian missionaries have been active in these areas since the 9th century. Unlike other peoples who inhabited the Roman provinces and established their quasi-states, the Croats built an autonomous and respectable state organization during the 9th century.

In the 10th century, the most important Croatian ruler was Tomislav. There are not many sources about his rule. During this period, Constantine VII wrote about the military strength of Croatia and its victory over the Bulgarians. Thomas the Archdeacon mentions Tomislav as a prince in 914, and the church councils of Split, held in 925 and 928. Archbishop Gregory mentions Tomislav's victory over Attila, the Hungarian king. The generally accepted view in historiography is that Tomislav was crowned Croatian king after a successful war with the Hungarians. This happened before 925 when Pope John X referred to him as King of the Croats. Since Thomas the Archdeacon dates the principality of Tomislav to 914, his coronation took place between 914 and 925.

The Duvno field with the city of Županjac was in the possession of Croatian kings till the 2nd half of the 13th century when it became the possession of the noble family Šubić. At the end of the 13th and beginning of the 14th century, the Šubić family, with approval from the Pope Boniface VIII, established three dioceses on the territory of the Archdiocese of Split, the Diocese of Šibenik, the Diocese of Makarska and the Diocese of Duvno. The motive for the establishment of those dioceses was to halt the spread of the Bosnian Church and strengthen of Šubićs' influence in the area. The seat of the Diocese of Duvno was the Church of Saint John the Baptist, located in the town of Rog, near the present-day Roško Polje. The bishops of Duvno served mostly as assistants to the archbishop of Split or were only titular bishops.

Until the 1320s, Duvno was part of the Kingdom of Croatia, when Stephen II, Ban of Bosnia took the land from Šubićs and incorporated it in the Banate of Bosnia. Duvno became a part of the Western Regions, a province of the Banate of Bosnia, together with Livno and Glamoč. However, the population of the Western Regions didn't identify with the Bosnian Kingdom. After King Tvrtko gave in the territory of Zachlumia westwards from the Neretva river to the Hungarian and Croatian King Louis I in 1357, Duvno became the southwesternmost part of his realm towards the Kingdom of Croatia.

A struggle broke out in the village of Kolo, in Duvno, in 1374, due to a division over loyalty between the Bosnian and Croatian-Hungarian King. For this reason, Tvrtko took over the village and gave it to the Semković family from Usora, and their ownership over the village was confirmed by King Dabiša in 1395. In 1404, King Ostoja gave Duvno and Glamoč to Duke Pavle Klešić. In 1444 or earlier, Duvno became a possession of Stjepan Vukčić Kosača, the duke of the Duchy of Saint Sava.

Ottoman Empire 

The Ottomans took advantage of the rivalry between Croatian nobles and entered parts of Bosnia in the 1430s. They first passed through the area of Tomislavgrad in 1449 on the way to Cetina, ie the area controlled by Croatian Ban Petar Talovac, at the invitation of Stjepan Vukčić Kosača. Namely, Kosača called on the Ottomans against Duke Sladoje Semković. During their campaign, the Ottomans took slaves and looted the country.

After completely conquering Bosnia in 1463, the Ottomans turned to Herzegovina. Between 1468 and 1469, the area of Završje – Glamoč, Livno, and Tomislavgrad – completely fell under Ottoman rule. The Ottomans founded the Sanjak of Herzegovina in 1470, while the Kaza of Drina, a subdivision of that sanjak in 1477 included the nahiyahs Drežnica, Ljubuški, Rog (the seat of Duvno).

For the next two centuries after the Ottoman conquest, there is not much information about life in the region of Duvno under Ottoman rule. The reason is that the majority of the population fled from the Ottoman invaders, and today's town was reduced to a small Ottoman kasbah known as Županj-Potok. An anonymous travel writer from the end of the 16th century wrote the following about Županj-Potok:

In the middle 16th century, the Ottomans founded a qasaba Županj-Potok. In 1576 Duvno became part of the Kadiluk of Imotski, and it became a kadiluk on its own before 1633. In the second half of the 17th century, Duvno became a part of the Sanjak of Klis, however, it was soon returned to the Herzegovinian Sanjak.

On 8 May 1711, Duvno became a captaincy. The seat of captaincy was Županj-Potok. The Captaincy of Duvno was located between the Captaincy of Livno at its north and the Captaincy of Ljubuški at its south; on its west was the Ottoman-Venetian border. Hasan Agha was named the first captain. In 1723, the Ottomans constructed a fort in Županj-Potok and named it Sedidžedid (the new wall), and named the captaincy after it.

The population of Duvno suffered heavily during the plagues of 1772, 1773, 1814, and 1815.

Hamdija Kreševljaković mentions a borough named Duvno at the end of the 17th century and also states that this borough became a kaza in the first years of the 18th century. In the middle of the 17th century Evliya Çelebi, a famous Turkish travel writer stated that Duvno "looks like a paradise garden, it is part of the Sanjak of Klis and has four hundred houses and one imposing mosque, many masjids, one inn, one hamam, and ten shops." Duvno remained under Ottoman rule until 1878 when Austria-Hungary occupied Bosnia and Herzegovina after the Berlin Congress.

Austria-Hungary 

During the Austro-Hungarian rule in Bosnia and Herzegovina, Tomislavgrad was known as Županjac. It was a seat of the Kotar of Županjac, which didn't include the region of Šujica, but it encompassed the villages of Vir, Zavelim and Zagorje in the present-day Municipality of Posušje.

Kingdom of Yugoslavia 

On 5 October 1918, the Croat, Slovene and Serb representatives in Austria-Hungary established the Nacional Council of the State of Slovenes, Croats and Serbs. The State of Slovenes, Croats and Serbs was united with the Kingdom of Serbia and the Kingdom of Montenegro on 1 December 1918 and formed the new state – Kingdom of Serbs, Croats and Slovenes.

The Srez of Županjac was divided into four municipalities, Grabovica, Vir, Županjac, and Brišnik-Oplećani, the latter existing from 1937 to 1940, when it was abolished and incorporated into the Municipality of Županjac.

The provincial of the Herzegovinian Franciscans, David Nevistić, himself from Tomislavgrad, agitated for the Croatian People's Party (HPS), an anti-Yugoslav political party and called the priests to support it, while the local parish priest Mijo Čuić, also a Franciscan, opposed him and instead supported a non-ideological Croatian Farmers' Party (HTS). The HPS tried to establish its branches in the Srez of Županjac and agitated in its villages, Vir, Vinica, Grabovica, Roško Polje, Bukovica, Šujica (at the time part of the Srez of Livno) and the town of Županjac itself. The temporary president of the Srez of Županjac Luka Savić forbade them from organizing political meetings.

According to the new lav, the Srez of Županjac became a part of the electoral unit of the Okrug of Travnik. During the Constitutional Assembly election held on 28 November 1920, although the Srez of Županjac had 4,675 eligible voters, the HPS won only 194 votes. On the other hand, the HTS won 3,726 votes.

Several Croatian parties, including the Croatian Republican Peasant Party of Stjepan Radić and the HTS, formed a coalition Croatian Bloc, headed by Radić. The HTS held a political meeting in Županjac, while the speaker was a Franciscan from Livno, Jako Pašalić. Pašalić visited Županjac often for political reasons. However, the efforts were counter-productive as the local populace didn't support their politics being led by the Franciscans. In the 1923 parliamentary election, the HTS candidate won only 31 votes, while the HPS won 68 votes. The HRSS won 3,847 votes.

The next parliamentary election was held on 8 February 1925. The HRSS was once again the dominant party in the Kotar of Županjac, winning 3,938 votes out of 4,737. The HPS won only 23 votes. Radić soon recognised the Vidovdan Constitution and the Karađorđević dynasty. This cost him some support from the Croat populace, however, he was still the favorite politician in the Srez of Županjac. In the autumn of 1926, he arrived in the Srez of Županjac, and was first greeted in Šujica by some 2,000 people. Before entering the town of Županjac, he was greeted by the parish priest Šimun Ančić. The next day he held a public meeting which was attended by some 10,000 people.

In 1928, King Alexander had a third son and named him Tomislav after Tomislav of Croatia, to appease the Croats. At the beginning of February 1928, a delegation was sent from Županjac headed by Šimun Ančić who handed Alexander the resolution in which the population of the Srez of Županjac asks him to change the name of the srez to Tomislavgrad, in honour of his son and Tomislav of Croatia. Not long after, Alexander granted them their petition but dropped Tomislav of Croatia from his decree.

Political failure enabled Čuić to engage in cultural work. On 8 July 1924, with the help of the Brethren of the Croatian Dragon, he laid the foundation for the Catholic basilica. The architect was Stjepan Podhorsky. By 1926, the construction was still far from over, so the Central Committee of the People of Duvno was established in Zagreb, led by an industrialist Milan Prpić, to collect the funds for the construction of the basilica. The exterior was finished in 1932. On Podhorsky's initiative, the Club of the Cyril-Methodian Masons was established in Zagreb, which served as a branch of the Brethren of the Croatan Dragon. The purpose of the Club was to collect the funds for the construction of the basilica.

In the autumn of 1929, the Srez of Županjac was incorporated into the Littoral Banovina, at the time headed by Ivo Tartaglia. Tartaglia was unsympathetic to the basilica project.

Although the construction of the basilica wasn't finished, it was consecrated on 29 September 1940, while the ceremony was attended by some 8,000 people. The consecrator was the Bishop of Mostar-Duvno Alojzije Mišić and was assisted by a Franciscan, Krešimir Pandžić.

In 1937, the Municipality of Brišnik-Oplećani was extracted from the Municipality of Tomislavgrad, so that the Yugoslav Radical Union (JRZ) could remain in power in the Srez of Tomislavgrad. After this decision, the Municipality of Tomislavgrad included only the town of Tomislavgrad, while the rest of the territory was incorporated into the newly-established Municipality of Brišnik-Oplećani. After the Srez of Tomislavgrad became a part of the Banovina of Croatia in 1939, the Municipality of Brišnik-Oplećani was abolished in 1940 and incorporated into the Municipality of Tomislavgrad.

Independent State of Croatia 

After the collapse of the Kingdom of Yugoslavia and the establishment of the German-Italian puppet the Independent State of Croatia (NDH) on 10 April 1941. The NDH was separated by the demarcation line, one zone controlled by the Italians and the other by the Germans. Tomislavgrad fell under the Italian demarcation zone.

The NDH was administratively divided into 22 grand counties. The Kotar of Tomislavgrad was part of the Grand County of Pliva-Rama. The Kotar of Tomislavgrad was further subdivided into several municipalities, including the urban centre – the Municipality of Tomislavgrad.

Šime Bančić from Split became the first district president. However, due to his opposition to the Ustaše government, he was quickly moved to Livno. Bančić was succeeded by Tomo Maleš from Sinj, who continued the policy of his predecessor. He was soon recalled to Zagreb and then sent to Sarajevo, where he was arrested and killed. In the summer of 1941, Tomislavgrad gained the third district president – Tripalo.

Alongside the civil authorities, the Ustaše established their own authority. The head of the Ustaše for the District of Tomislavgrad was logornik Jozo Brstilo, while the Ustaše organisation on the municipality level was headed by tabornik Bajro Tanović, originally from Gacko. The head of the police in Tomislavgrad was Josip Antić from Ključ. The Italian occupation government disallowed their presence in Tomislavgrad, until the signing of the Treaty of Rome on 18 May 1941, when they were allowed to take control over Tomislavgrad.

Immediately after the establishment of the NDH, the Ustaše in Tomislavgrad, led by Brstilo and Tanović, organised the persecution of local Serbs. The Communist Party of Yugoslavia's (KPJ) local committee in Livno was in charge of the District of Tomislavgrad, and organised the first Partisan units. Fearing of the spread of the rebellion, the Italians once again occupied Tomislavgrad in September 1941 and took control of the political and military affairs until June 1942. While the NDH civil authorities remained active, the Ustaše organisation was expelled from Tomislavgrad.

During the second Italian occupation, the communists managed to expand the number of partisans and their activities. The KPJ Livno was part of the Communist Party of Croatia's branch for the region of Dalmatia. Thus, the Partisans of Tomislavgrad were directly subordinated to the communist leadership from Croatia. The territory of the Kotar of Tomislavgrad was part of the Fourth Operational Zone of Croatia.

Socialist Yugoslavia 

After the war, the Srez of Duvno became a part of the newly-established Federal Bosnia and Herzegovina and in 1945 became a part of the Okrug of Travnik. The seat of the srez was in the town Duvno, and it included these local communities:

 Mrkodol, included the villages of Mesihovina, Mrkodol and Bukovica
 Brišnik, included the villages of Brišnik, Cebara, Omerovići and Kovači
 Borčani, included the villages of Borčani, Kongora, Omolje, Seonica, and Crvenice
 Jošanica, included the villages of Stipanići, Jošanica, Podgaj, and Kolo
 Eminovo Selo, included the villages of Blažuj, Eminovo Selo, Mokronoge and Luk
 Letka, included the villages of Oplećani, Vedašić, Letka and Kuk
 Mandino Selo, included the villages of Lipa, Mandino Selo, Rašćani and Srđani
 Prisoje, included the villages of Prisoje and Vrilo
 Grabovica, included the villages of Grabovica, Dobrići, Korita, and Zidine
 Renići, included the villages of Bukova Gora, Kazaginac, Renići, Rašeljke, Liskovača and Prisika
 Zaljut, included the villages of Mijakovo Polje, Zaljut and Rošnjače
 Hambari, included the villages of Vojkovići, Radoši, Hambari and Roško Polje
 Zaljuće, included the villages of Vranjača, Kosnice, Krnjin, and Zaljuće
 Vinica, included the villages of Vinica and Pasić
 Gornje Ravno, included the villages of Gornje Ravno, Donje Ravno, Mušić and Zvirnjača.

In 1950, the Srez of Duvno became a part of the Okrug of Mostar. In 1952, the okrugs were abolished, while the country was divided into 66 srezs, one of which was Duvno.

In mid-1955, the country was divided into 15 srezs, while Duvno became a municipality within the Srez of Livno. In 1962, the number of srezs was lowered to 6, and the Municipality of Duvno, with 61 settlements, became a part of the Srez of Mostar. In 1966, the srezs were abolished.

Contemporary

Name change 

During the January 1990 public gatherings, the citizens demanded that the name of the town and municipality be changed to Tomislavgrad, a name used between 1928 and 1946. For this reason, the Municipal Committee of the Socialist Union of Working People of Duvno (OK SSRN) asked the Municipal Assembly of Duvno to start a referendum on the matter. However, the Assembly refused to proceed further on regarding the name change, requesting valid reasons for such a move. In April 1990, an anonymous initiator started a petition to change the name of the town to Tomislavgrad. The petition managed to collect 6,000 signatures. The Executive Council of the Assembly proposed the voting on the petition, and on 9 July 1990, the Assembly decided to hold a referendum, with 52 votes in favour and 6 against. The referendum was held on 12 August 1990, with 98.91% of the voters supporting the name change. The voting passed peacefully without incidents. Due to the summer pause, the Municipal Assembly met again only on 1 October 1990 and adopted the report of the electoral commission on the referendum and sent a proposal to the Assembly of the SR Bosnia and Herzegovina to enact the change of name for the town and the municipality of Duvno. On 30 October 1990, the Assembly of the SR BiH adopted the law on the name change. The traffic signs were changed in December 1990.

Settlements
• Baljci
• Blažuj
• Bogdašić
• Borčani
• Bukova Gora
• Bukovica
• Cebara
• Crvenice
• Ćavarov Stan
• Dobrići
• Donji Brišnik
• Eminovo Selo
• Galečić
• Gornja Prisika
• Gornji Brišnik
• Grabovica
• Jošanica
• Kazaginac
• Kolo
• Kongora
• Korita
• Kovači
• Krnjin
• Kuk
• Letka
• Lipa
• Liskovača
• Lug
• Mandino Selo
• Mesihovina
• Mijakovo Polje
• Mokronoge
• Mrkodol
• Omerovići
• Omolje
• Oplećani
• Pasić
• Podgaj
• Prisoje
• Radoši
• Rašćani
• Rašeljke
• Raško Polje
• Renići
• Rošnjače
• Sarajlije
• Seonica
• Srđani
• Stipanjići
• Šuica
• Tomislavgrad
• Vedašić
• Vinica
• Vojkovići
• Vranjače
• Vrilo
• Zaljiće
• Zaljut
• Zidine

Economy

Tomislavgrad today is in a very hard economic situation. Many people emigrated from it in the 1960s and 1970s, but mostly during war in the 1990s. Most went to Croatia (mostly Zagreb), Western Europe (Germany), and Australia. Among the companies active in the city there are couple big companies as "Kapis Tomislavgrad","Kamensko d.o.o."and some transport and construction companies.

Monuments and culture
In downtown Tomislavgrad, there is a huge monument in tribute of King Tomislav made by sculptor Vinko Bagarić from Zagreb and installed in the 1990s after the Bosnian War.

Sports
The town is home to the football club HNK Tomislav.

Twin towns – sister cities
Tomislavgrad is twinned with:

 Biograd na Moru, Croatia
 Bjelovar, Croatia
 Đakovo, Croatia
 Jajce, Bosnia and Herzegovina
 Knin, Croatia
 Nin, Croatia
 Novska, Croatia
 Solin, Croatia

Footnotes

References

Books

Journals

News articles

External links

Populated places in Tomislavgrad